The Corruption of Divine Providence is a Canadian supernatural horror film, directed by Jeremy Torrie and released in 2020. Set in a small Métis community in Manitoba, the film centres on Jeanne Séraphin (Ali Skovbye), a teenage girl who becomes possessed in a spiritual battle between good and evil forces.

The cast also includes David La Haye and Elyse Levesque as Jeanne's parents Louis and Danielle, Corey Sevier as a Christian televangelist who becomes involved in Jeanne's case, and Paul Amos as Saint Francis, as well as Tantoo Cardinal, Eugene Brave Rock, Sera-Lys McArthur and Angela Narth in supporting roles.

The film premiered in October 2020 at the Reelworld Film Festival. It was subsequently screened at the 2020 Whistler Film Festival and the 2021 Canadian Film Festival, before being commercially released to video on demand platforms in May 2021. At Whistler, Skovbye and Levesque were named as Stars to Watch by the British Columbia chapter of ACTRA.

References

External links
 

2020 films
2020 horror films
Canadian supernatural horror films
Films shot in Manitoba
Métis film
Films set in Manitoba
2020s English-language films
2020s French-language films
2020s Canadian films